The Dragon Li is a recently established Chinese breed of domestic cat (also called Chinese Li Hua or China Li Hua as a standardized breed, depending on breed registry). The derived standardized breed is recognized by China's Cat Aficionado Association (CAA) the US-based, international Cat Fanciers' Association (CFA) (Later revoked).

Physical characteristics
The Dragon Li displays a unique golden-brown, broken-mackerel (also known as broken-striped) tabby pattern; distinctive ear tipping; large round almond shaped luminescent yellow/green eyes; and a strong full bodied stature reminiscent of its wild nature.

Origin

The eponymous Dragon Li is thought in China to be a natural self-domesticating breed by way of a wildcat subspecies, the Chinese mountain cat (Felis silvestris bieti). While this theory is still somewhat controversial, it has also not been scientifically disproven, and is therefore widely accepted as the origin of this breed within established breeding sources in China. (All other cat breeds in the world are known to be descended from F. s. lybica, the African wildcat.)

 is the prevalent name for the original variety in China. More recently, the names Chinese Li Hua and Dragon Li have been used internationally for the standardized breed. The dragon is a potent symbol in Chinese folklore, standing for power and good luck.

Popularity
The Dragon Li debuted as an experimental-class standardized breed in Beijing, China, in January 2004 All-breed Judges Dolores Kennedy and Barb Belanger of the American Cat Fanciers Association (ACFA) were guests of the Cat Aficionado Association (CAA) and judged the event. There were four of these pedigreed Dragon Li in the United States .

In 2005, a male specimen named Needy, presented by its owner Da Han, was shown and won its class as first place CAA champion. The event was judged by John Douglas Blackmore of the ACFA. Needy was then "married" to a breeding partner in an elaborate mockup of a traditional Chinese wedding ceremony, attracting some press coverage. In February 2010, the Li Hua was accepted for showing in the miscellaneous class by the international (US-based) Cat Fanciers' Association (CFA). Since gaining international recognition, and due in part to its limited availability, the Dragon Li / Chinese Li Hua has now become of interest to cat fanciers internationally.

The story has more recently served as the basis for the third episode (rendered "Wild Cat Exchanged for Crown Prince" in English) of the Hong Kong television series Justice Pao.

References

External links

Breed Profile Web Page- The Chinese Li Hua - In CFA (Cat Fanciers' Association)
Chinese Li Hua Standard Modification 2014 - In CFA (Cat Fanciers' Association)
The Messybeast.com Cat Breed List

Cat breeds
Natural cat breeds
Cat breeds originating in China